Brights Spring is a stream in Barry County in the U.S. state of Missouri.

Brights Spring has the name of O. P. Bright, the original owner of the site.

See also
List of rivers of Missouri

References

Rivers of Barry County, Missouri
Rivers of Missouri